Now a highly celebrated symphony orchestra in Armenia and oversees, the Armenian State Symphony Orchestra emerged from a group of devout enthusiasts of classical music, assembled with the shared vision of championing spiritual excellence through music and upholding the musical traditions of their native Armenia. Owing to its finely distinct quality of sound, combined with the intimate and emotionally charged style of performance, the orchestra has garnered critical acclaim internationally, growing into an awaited guest in most prestigious concert halls around the world.

History 

Established by the present Artistic Director and Principal Conductor Sergey Smbatyan and home to bright and energetic musicians from the outset, the orchestra performs over 50 concerts in Armenia and across the world annually. The rich and diverse repertoire of the orchestra covers multiple genres and performance formats, ranging from symphonies to ballet and opera music to symphonic arrangements of popular and cinematic music or jazz interpretations of classical music, etc. Along with recurrent debut performances of great masterpieces from the world heritage of classical music in Armenia, the orchestra places a considerable importance in exposing contemporary and young composers as well, featuring new works in its mainstream programming throughout concert seasons.

Projects, Festivals 

To ensure the sustainability of Armenian classical music heritage, raise cultural awareness of wider audiences locally and scale the prominence of Armenia as a cultural center globally, the Armenian State Symphony Orchestra has invested its efforts in founding four annual classical music festivals, all held in Armenia. The Khachaturian International Music Festival, the Armenian Composing Art Festival, the “ARMENIA” International Music Festival and the “Contemporary Classics” Composers’ Festival have hosted a multitude of internationally celebrated virtuoso performers, composers and other artists over years and have also been an important platform for many young artists to gain recognition. 
The creatively unsettling mind is what lies at the core of the innovative and searching nature of the Armenian State Symphony Orchestra, with the firm belief in the meaningful future dialogue between classical music and modern technologies. For many years now, it has been profiled as a highly tech-driven orchestra that is in a never-ending pursuit of novelty and diversity by leveraging AI, AR and other high-tech solutions in its artistic endeavors.
Some of the recent engagements in IT-friendly projects includes the orchestra’s participation in “WCIT 2019”, the largest IT Congress for innovators and entrepreneurs, hosted in 2019 by Armenia. An orchestra of 100 musicians from fifteen countries were assembled in a single orchestra led by Sergey Smbatyan, to play the AI real-time composed music at the opening ceremony of the event. The newly created music was composed of elements from Armenian medieval Sharakan chants and national anthems of the participating countries, resulting in an iconic new hymn of WCIT-2019. As the official orchestra of the Khachaturian International Competition, held in 2020 online for the first time in history due to the COVID-19 pandemic restrictions, the Armenian State Symphony Orchestra participated in the final round through a dedicated digital platform developed with AI solutions. Encouraged by this success, the new ArmSymphony AI Violin Competition was launched in 2021 in cooperation with the Indiana University, USA and MetaMusic, incorporating the Cadenza Live Accompanist digital platform, which enabled to hold the violin competition entirely online with application of AI tools. The orchestra cooperates closely with the famous US based company Parma Recordings and other international partners to enlarge its high-tech capacities and look for prospect of further engagements (e.g. providing data for far-reaching musical Big-data development projects).
With a committed awareness of its social responsibility, the  Armenian  State  Symphony  Orchestra  is  acknowledged  for  its growing  input  in  the  education  of  young  people  in  Armenia. The DasA project aims to popularize high art and provoke positive transformation in the young generation’s attitude towards music. Aside from the DasA project, master classes with prominent artists are held frequently both in and outside the frameworks of festivals of the Armenian State Symphony  Orchestra.

Cooperation 

It has been profiled multiple times with world-renowned composers such as Krzysztof Penderecki, Sir Karl Jenkins, Giya Kancheli and Tigran Mansuryan as well as a number of highly distinguished virtuosos. The Armenian State Symphony Orchestra has a history of close relationships with Valery Gergiev, Vladimir Spivakov, Maxim Vengerov, Denis Matsuev, Vadim Repin, Vag Papian, Boris Berezovsky, Zakhar Bron and other globally celebrated artists.

The Armenian State Symphony Orchestra has been hosted by many reputable concert halls around the world, including Opera Garnier (Paris), Konzerthaus (Berlin), Dr. Anton Philipszaal (Hague), Tchaikovsky Concert Hall and the Great Hall of Conservatory (Moscow), Palais des Beaux-Arts (Brussels), Elbphilharmonie (Hamburg), Royal Theatre (Madrid), Dubai Opera House and others.

A remarkable chapter in the history of the orchestra was the 2020 European Tour with the renowned violin virtuoso and the Armenian State Symphony Orchestra’s Artist-in-Residence Maxim Vengerov, with brilliant performances hosted on famous stages around Europe - Berliner Philharmonie, Vienna's Musikverein, London's Barbican Center, Prague's Dvorak Hall, Salzburg's Grosses Festspielhaus and Moscow's Zaryadye Concert Hall.

Aside from the extensive concert activity in Armenia and overseas, the orchestra also enjoys recognition and is highly esteemed for its increasing role in educating young people in Armenia. Since 2018, in the framework of DasA educational-cultural project the Armenian State Symphony Orchestra and Sergey Smbatyan have been sparking interest and liking for classical music in high-school students across Armenia, with an attempt to galvanize a larger movement for cultivating noble insights and taste for classical music among the young generation.A number of orchestra’s concerts have been broadcast by Medici.tv, EuroNews, and Classic.fm. In 2019, a documentary was released by Mezzo TV, featuring Sergey Smbatyan and the history of the Armenian State Symphony Orchestra. The Armenian State Symphony Orchestra is represented worldwide by Only Stage.

Artistic Direct

External links 

 
 
 https://escs.am/en/news/5822
 https://escs.am/en/news/5867
 http://musicofarmenia.com/armenian-state-symphony-orchestra

Armenian orchestras
Musical groups established in 2005